is a 1999 Japanese philosophical drama film written and directed by Kiyoshi Kurosawa, starring Kōji Yakusho.

The film is about a dispute between a number of people about a unique but possibly toxic tree growing in an unnamed forest. The film is largely seen from the point of view of Goro Yabuike (Kōji Yakusho), a police negotiator who has been relieved of his duties following his failure to prevent the death of an important hostage.  He stands in the middle of the conflicting opinions about the future of the tree, and has to decide which course to commit himself to.

Plot
Goro Yabuike is a hostage negotiator. He attends an incident where an MP is being held at gunpoint. The captor's ransom note reads "Restore the Rules of the World". When Yabuike has a chance to shoot the hostage-taker he hesitates. The captor kills the MP, and is in turn killed by the police. Afterwards Yabuike explains that he thought he could help both men. He is suspended from duty. He is dropped off in the middle of a mysterious forest. He comes across various people who are in a dispute about an apparently unique tree named 'Charisma' growing in a clearing in the forest. Jinbo believes the plant is toxic will eventually kill the whole forest.  She wants to poison the tree so that the forest can be restored to its original condition. Kiriyama, a former sanatorium patient, wants to protect the tree, even if this leads to the death of the rest of the forest. Other military figures want to take the tree away for a collector.

Yabuike becomes the central figure in the dispute, somehow able to decide what will happen. After the tree has been stolen by the militia, recaptured by Kiriyama with Yabuike's help, and burned by Jinbo, a new, bigger tree appears, possibly similar to Charisma.  Yabuike mulls over the two choices he faces: saving the individual tree, or saving the whole forest. He decides that the dichotomy is a false one.  First that life and death are part of the same force, and second that every tree is a special tree and together they are a forest, but simultaneously no tree signifies anything more than any other.  Ultimately some will live and some will die and some will be killed and some will be saved.

When the head of the militia takes Jinbo hostage, Yabuike has no hesitation in shooting, though not killing, him.  The final scene shows Yabuike making his way back to the city to seek treatment for the injured militia. In the distance, the city can be seen in flames.

Cast
 Kōji Yakusho - Goro Yabuike
 Hiroyuki Ikeuchi - Kiriyama, who wants to protect the tree
 Ren Osugi - Nakasone
 Yoriko Douguchi - Chizuru Jinbo
 Jun Fubuki - Mitsuko Jinbo, an expert on plants
 Akira Otaka - Tsuboi
 Yutaka Matsushige - Nekoshima

Production
The screenplay originally written in the early 1990s earned Kiyoshi Kurosawa a scholarship from the Sundance Institute to study filmmaking at the United States.

Release
Charisma was shown at the 1999 Cannes Film Festival. It was later released in Japan on February 26, 2000.

Reception
Kris Nelson of Dreamlogic.net gave the film a favorable review, noting that "the soundtrack is perfect". The film has been interpreted by some as an allegorical tale about the structure of Japanese society, and the tension between the importance of individuality on the one hand, and the importance of the group on the other.  It is also possible to discern an ecological message. Travis Mackenzie Hoover of Exclaim! said, "with its combination of Tarkovskian natural wonder, Beckett absurdity and good old fashioned movie élan, it's guaranteed that you'll care enough to see into its deeply troubled heart of darkness."

Notes

References

External links
 
 
 

1999 films
1999 drama films
1990s Japanese-language films
Films directed by Kiyoshi Kurosawa
Films about trees
Japanese drama films
1990s Japanese films